The 1978 President Park's Cup Football Tournament was the eighth competition of Korea Cup. It was held from 9 to 21 September 1978, and was won by South Korea for the fifth time, who defeated Washington Diplomats in the final.

Group stage

Group A

Group B

Group C

Group D

Knockout stage

Bracket

Quarter-finals

Semi-finals

Third place play-off

Final

See also
Korea Cup
South Korea national football team results

References

External links
President Park's Cup 1978 (South Korea) at RSSSF

1978